H100 or H-100 may refer to:

 H.100 (computer telephony), a standard for communication between PCI cards in a computer telephony system
 H100 series, a diesel multiple unit train in Japan
 Heathkit H100, a kit by Heathkit sold assembled as the Zenith Z-100 computer
 Hyundai Grace, a minibus or van
 Hyundai Porter, a pickup truck
 iRiver H100 series, a series of hard drive digital audio players produced by iriver
 The fourth generation of Toyota HiAce, also known as H100
 Nvidia H100 GPU